The SofCheck Inspector is a static analysis tool for Java and Ada.  It statically determines and documents the pre- and postconditions of Java methods or Ada subprograms, and uses that information to identify logic flaws, race conditions, and redundant code in an individual Java class or Ada package, a subsystem, or a complete program.  The SofCheck Inspector is produced by SofCheck, Inc., a software product company in Burlington, Massachusetts.

The SofCheck Inspector static analysis engine is used within the CodePeer static analysis product from AdaCore.

See also
Static code analysis
Software testing
Software Security Assurance
List of tools for static code analysis

References

External links
SofCheck, Inc. web site
Video on technology underlying SofCheck Inspector
SofCheck Inspector to support Common Weakness Enumeration (CWE)
AdaCore's CodePeer developed in partnership with SofCheck

Static program analysis tools
Java development tools
Java platform software